No. 7 Commando was a unit of the British Commandos and part of the British Army during the Second World War. The commando was formed in August 1940 in the United Kingdom. No. 7 Commando was transferred to the Middle East as part of Layforce. Committed to the Battle of Crete, it suffered heavy casualties, after which it was disbanded.

Background
The commandos were formed in 1940, by the order of Winston Churchill the British prime minister. He called for specially trained troops that would "develop a reign of terror down the enemy coast".  At first they were a small force of volunteers who carried out small raids against enemy occupied territory, but by 1943 their role had changed into lightly equipped assault Infantry which specialised in spearheading amphibious landings.

The man initially selected as the overall commander of the force was Admiral Sir Roger Keyes himself a veteran of the landings at Galipoli and the Zeebrugge raid in the First World War. Keyes resigned in October 1941 and was replaced by Admiral Louis Mountbatten.

By the autumn of 1940 more than 2,000 men had volunteered for commando training, and what became known as the Special Service Brigade was formed into 12 units called commandos. Each commando would number around 450 men commanded by a lieutenant colonel. They were sub divided into troops of 75 men and further divided into 15-man sections. Commandos were all volunteers seconded from other British Army regiments and retained their own cap badges and remained on their regimental roll for pay. All volunteers went through the six-week intensive commando course at Achnacarry. The course in the Scottish Highlands concentrated on fitness, speed marches, weapons training, map reading, climbing, small boat operations and demolitions both by day and by night.

History
No. 7 Commando was formed in Felixstowe in July 1940 and in December 1940 were sent to Scotland for boat training. They were then re-designated 3rd Special Service Battalion on 24 October 1941 and sent to the Middle East. On arrival in Alexandria they were assigned to Layforce – a commando formation commanded by Robert Laycock – as 'A' Battalion.

Their first planned operation was the invasion of Rhodes, which was later cancelled. This was followed by the raid on Bardia on 19 April 1941, which was a fiasco later publicised by Evelyn Waugh. They were next sent to take part in the Battle of Crete, assisting in the evacuation of the Allied forces who were subjected to aerial bombardment by German forces, most of the men of the commando were taken prisoner. After Crete the commando was disbanded and its personnel sent to other commando units in the theatre or returned to their previous units.

Battle honours
The following Battle honours were awarded to the British Commandos during the Second World War.

Adriatic
Alethangyaw
Aller
Anzio
Argenta Gap
Burma 1943–45
Crete
Dieppe
Dives Crossing
Djebel Choucha
Flushing
Greece 1944–45
Italy 1943–45
Kangaw
Landing at Porto San Venere
Landing in Sicily
Leese
Litani
Madagascar
Middle East 1941, 1942, 1944
Monte Ornito
Myebon
Normandy Landing
North Africa 1941–43
North-West Europe 1942, 1944–1945
Norway 1941
Pursuit to Messina
Rhine
St. Nazaire
Salerno
Sedjenane 1
Sicily 1943
Steamroller Farm
Syria 1941
Termoli
Vaagso
Valli di Comacchio
Westkapelle

References
Notes

Bibliography

7
Military units and formations established in 1940
Military units and formations disestablished in 1941
1940 establishments in the United Kingdom
1941 disestablishments in the United Kingdom